Gregorio de Beteta, O.P. (died 1562) was a Roman Catholic prelate who served as Bishop-Elect of Cartagena, Colombia from 1552 to 1562.

Biography
Gregorio de Beteta was ordained a priest in the Order of Preachers.
On 28 June 1552 he was appointed during the papacy of Pope Julius III as Bishop of Cartagena.
In 1556, he resigned before he was consecrated bishop.
He died in 1562 as Bishop-Elect of Cartagena.

References

External links and additional sources
 (for Chronology of Bishops) 
 (for Chronology of Bishops) 

16th-century Roman Catholic bishops in New Granada
Bishops appointed by Pope Julius III
Roman Catholic bishops of Cartagena in Colombia
1562 deaths
Dominican bishops